This is a list containing the Billboard Hot Latin Tracks number-ones of 1992.

References

United States Latin Songs
1992
1992 in Latin music